Mike Rossner is a United States-based advocate for academic journal publishing reform and open access. He was the director of the Rockefeller University Press from December 2006 to May 2013.

Background
In 1997, Rossner became editor of the Journal of Cell Biology.  On 1 December 2006, he became director of The Rockefeller University Press and became interim editor of the Journal of Cell Biology until his replacement was hired.

In July 2009, Rossner was awarded as a SPARC Innovator by the Scholarly Publishing and Academic Resources Coalition.

Projects
Rossner is one of the organizers of Access2Research.

He is a supporter of open-access mandates.

References

Copyright activists
Open access activists
Copyright scholars
Living people
Year of birth missing (living people)